Dronovo is a rural locality (a selo) in Gribsky Selsoviet of Blagoveshchensky District, Amur Oblast, Russia. The population was 232 as of 2018. There are 4 streets.

Geography 
Dronovo is located in the valley of the Bolshoy Alim River, 35 km southeast of Blagoveshchensk (the district's administrative centre) by road. Sadovoye is the nearest rural locality.

References 

Rural localities in Blagoveshchensky District, Amur Oblast